Raphael Khouri (previously Amahl Raphael Khouri) Is a Jordanian queer, transgender documentary playwright, journalist, activist, and theatre artist.

Early life and education 
Khouri was born in the United States, but moved to Saudi Arabia, and lived his teenage years in Jordan. Khouri earned his bachelor's degree (BA) in Communications from the Lebanese American University in Beirut, Lebanon.

Career 
Khouri started his career as a journalist but was introduced to documentary theatre through a festival in Alexandria, Egypt.

Before becoming a documentary playwright, Khouri was an apprentice to a prominent stage director in Lebanon and intended to become a director himself. After finding difficulty entering the directing world, Khouri turned to working as a journalist while he set out to write his own play. Taking inspiration form Antonin Artaud (among other theorists), Khouri decided to explore writing within the documentary theatre genre.

Khouri has also been commissioned to write new work for the Outburst Queer Arts Festival in Belfast (features in 2019 and 2020), and he will appear in the upcoming International Queer Drama anthology published by Neofelis Verlag, and the Methuen Anthology of Trans Plays.

Plays and publications

Ich brauche meine Ruhe (I Need Some Peace and Quiet) 
First performed at the Politik im Freien Theatre Festival in 2018.

No Matter Where I Go 
First performed in Beirut in 2014, No Matter Where I Go is a play that explores how queer people navigate public spaces and how their identity is constantly questioned within these spaces. Khouri explains that the Lebanese media is profit-oriented and often misrepresented homosexuality and queerness. No Matter Where I Go actively fights against stigmatization by elevating narratives that disrupted the hegemony portrayed in Lebanese media.

This was the first queer Arab performance of its kind. Though some Arab plays had some gay content, this was the first work that went out of its way to be queer. This text was performed as pot of “Bodies in Public” a conference on bodies in Beirut. It is published in the anthology, Global Queer Plays.

Oh, How We Loved Our Tuna 
This work was created for Climate Change Theatre Action. Khouri describes this play as an elegy to all the fish that have been killed due to climate change. Khouri stated, "That’s what happened to the tuna, they loved it so much that they’ve killed it.”

Fellowships and grants 
 Playwright for Acrola Queer Plays (London 2018)
 Playwright at The Lark hotINK international play reading series (New York 2015)
 Recipient of Rosenthal Emerging Voices Fellowship for poetry from PEN USA (Los Angeles 2007)

References 

Living people
Year of birth missing (living people)
Transgender dramatists and playwrights
Jordanian activists
Lebanese American University alumni